The Emilia-Romagna Open is a professional tennis tournament played on clay courts. It is currently part of the WTA Tour for women and minor league ATP Challenger Tour for men. It is held annually in Montechiarugolo, Parma, Italy since 2021 (for women) and 2019 (for men).

Past finals

Women's singles

Women's doubles

Men's singles

Men's doubles

See also 
 Internazionali di Modena
 Veneto Open
 Internazionali di Tennis Città di Parma
 Parma Challenger

References

WTA Tour
ATP Challenger Tour
Clay court tennis tournaments
Tennis tournaments in Italy
Sport in Parma
Recurring sporting events established in 2019
Emilia-Romagna Open